Juan Rivero (born 22 November 1940) is a Uruguayan boxer. He competed in the men's lightweight event at the 1968 Summer Olympics.

References

1940 births
Living people
Uruguayan male boxers
Olympic boxers of Uruguay
Boxers at the 1968 Summer Olympics
Boxers at the 1967 Pan American Games
Pan American Games bronze medalists for Uruguay
Pan American Games medalists in boxing
Sportspeople from Montevideo
Lightweight boxers
Medalists at the 1967 Pan American Games